Warrensburg Hydroelectric Dam is a run-of-the-river hydroelectric generation plant located on the Schroon River in Warrensburg, NY.  According to the National Inventory of Dams (NID), the dam was completed in 1909, designed by Besha Engineering, and modified in the year 1989.  Currently the dam is owned and operated by the Quebec-based Boralex power company, and has a capacity of 3 megawatts, or enough energy to power 3,000 homes. The dam's reservoir serves as Warrensburg's boat launch and recreational area.

References

External links

 

1909 establishments in New York (state)
Hydroelectric power plants in New York (state)
Run-of-the-river power stations